Konyalıya Güzel Derler(Konyalı) is a Turkish folkloric tune (Kaşık Havası).Konyalı is a form of the Turkish folk dance Kaşık Havası.

Original form
The original form of the türkü was popular in Konya .

See also
Kaşık Havası
Konyali
Pınar başı burma burma

References

Turkish music
Turkish songs